EMSY is a protein that in humans is encoded by the EMSY gene.

Clinical significance 
EMSY has been shown to associate with atopy and susceptibility to poly-sensitisation.

Interactions 

EMSY has been shown to interact with ZMYND11, BRCA2 and CBX1.

References

External links

Further reading